The Legend of Luo Xiaohei (罗小黑战记) is a flash animation and webtoon developed by Chinese artist MTJJ (real name Zhang Ping 章平). It derives from an animated series that was mainly broadcast online in March 2011. The franchise has also been extended to become a social media sticker series on WeChat. As of July 18, 2021, 40 episodes of "The Legend of Luo Xiaohei" are available alongside 3 extra videos, "Exam Day", "Sh…", and "Goodnight Meow". A feature-length prequel film named "The Legend of Hei" was released in Chinese and Japanese theaters in September, 2019.

The series was adapted into a graphic novel in 2015, published by Beijing United Publishing. It has also been turned into a mobile game titled "Luo Xiaohei's Battle Demon Book" (罗小黑战记妖灵簿) by Beijing Manya Entertainment Culture Media Co.

Plot 
The story begins on a rainy night when Luo Xiao Hei, a cat spirit, is badly injured after stealing Laojun's pearl artifact.  As a result, he is transformed from his humanoid form to become a black kitten. He is then saved by a young girl named Luo Xiaobai, who takes him home. Luo Xiaobai and Luo Xiao Hei become good friends and their adventure begins. They live in a world where people, spirits, and gods coexist.

Characters
 Luo Xiaohei (罗小黑): The protagonist of the series. Although young, Xiaohei is a powerful, quick, and adaptable cat elfin who is training to become an Executor. In order to complete his training, he was given three tasks by his master Wuxian to complete. His first, to steal the Pearl of Heaven from Laojun, ended with him getting injured and being taken in by the Luo family. He initially hated humanity because some were responsible for the destruction of his home forest, but after learning more about them his hatred subsided. 
 Luo Xiaobai (罗小白): A human girl who finds Xiao Hei in an alleyway, under the assumption that he was an abandoned cat. Xiaobai is a curious and friendly child who is welcoming to the supernatural world, although she can't quite understand certain concepts. She is close with A'gen, seeing him as an older brother figure; and Shanxin, who is her best friend and occasional gaming buddy.
 A'Gen (阿根): An elfin who lives in the countryside. He aims to protect the peace between humans and elfin, often helping other spirits out or accompanying Xiao Hei on his adventures. He is also quick-witted and teaches Xiao Bai some of the basics of the supernatural world. While he primarily uses ice magic, he is equally as adept at fire. Many elfin are under the impression that he is the powerful elfin Xuan Li taking a human guise.
 Wuxian (无限): a 437 year old human who works for the mainland's Spirit Guild as an "Executor". He also serves as Xiaohei's mentor and parental figure.
 Laojun (老君): An extremely powerful elfin who lives in his own spiritual domain, Bluestream Town. He is the owner of the Book of Vows, a long list of quests that he's given out over the centuries. Although he is interested in the human world, he is bound to his domain for 100 years and needs Diting to scout for him. In the meantime, he has grown lazy and developed an interest in games and anime.
 Shanxin (山新): A human girl who is friends with Luo Xiaobai. She is a silver tongued and tomboyish gamer and a lover of MMORPGs. Her game knowledge eventually proves useful when she is pulled into the All Living Things elfin video game, and she is made the strategist of Xiaohei's group.

Voice Cast
 Shanxin as Luo Xiaohei, Luo Xiaobai, A'Gen, Shanxin, and Xiaoji
 Huang Zhenji as Diting, Yunfei, and Daji
 Ding Dang as Qiguo, Tan Ju, Mu Si, A'Xian, and Dong Dong
 Xiaotan as Laojun
 Xaihou Luofeng as Kali
 Sheng Feng as Wuxian
 Taobao as Bidiu
 Ah Suo as Heixiu
 Lu Rufei as Fenmo
 Kiki as Mother

Episodes

Prequel Film 

The Legend of Hei is an animated film prequel to the animated series The Legend of Luo Xiaohei released in Summer 2019. The movie details various events in the life of Luo Xiaohei before the show.

References

Chinese animated television series
Fictional cats
Animated feature films
Animated web series
Flash cartoons